Damnonia may refer to:

 Damnonia, land of the Damnonii, a Celtic tribe of Roman Britain in what today is southern Scotland
 Damnonia, a name of the Kingdom of Strathclyde, the early mediaeval kingdom that subsumed the Damnonii
 Damnonia, an alternative spelling of Dumnonia, the early mediaeval kingdom (named for the Celtic tribe of Roman Britain, the Dumnonii), in what today is Devon and Cornwall.